Model Engineering College or MEC is a government cost-sharing technical institute and research centre in Thrikkakara, Kochi, Kerala, India. It was established by the Institute of Human Resources Development (IHRD), an autonomous agency under the Government of Kerala, in 1989. It is affiliated to the APJ Abdul Kalam Technological University (KTU) since 2015. 

MEC was previously affiliated to the Cochin University of Science and Technology (CUSAT) until 2015. 'Excel' is the annual national techno-managerial festival conducted by MEC since 2001 under the motto "Inspire, Innovate, Engineer".

All B.Tech programs offered by the institute are accredited by the National Board of Accreditation (NBA).

History
MEC was established in 1989 by the Institute of Human Resources Development (IHRD), an autonomous technical educational research institute established by the Government of Kerala in 1987. MEC was the first institute in Kerala to be affiliated to the Cochin University of Science and Technology (CUSAT). The institute shifted into its current campus in 1994. It is affiliated to the APJ Abdul Kalam Technological University (KTU) since 2015.

Campus

Facilities
 Additional Skill Acquisition Programme (ASAP) Kerala Delivery Platform 
 Amphitheatre
 Basketball ground
 Cafeteria 
 Central Computing Centre 
 Central Library
 College Buses
 Counselling Facility 
 Football ground
 Gymnasium
 Laboratories and Workshops
 Main Auditorium
 Mens Hostel
 Open air theatre
 Placement Cell
 State Bank of India ATM
 University Research Centre
 Wi-Fi

Organization and Administration

Governance 
The Board of Governors (BoG) of MEC is constituted by the Institute of Human Resources Development. It includes educationalists, industrialists,  representatives from All India Council of Technical Education (AICTE), University Grants Commission (UGC), Indian Institutes of Technology (IIT), APJ Abdul Kalam Technological University (KTU), a state government nominee from its department of higher education, the college principal, and some faculty members.

Departments 
The institute has six departments. They are:
 Department of Computer engineering 
 Department of Electronics and Communication engineering
 Department of Electrical and Electronics engineering
 Department of Electronics and Biomedical engineering
 Department of Mechanical engineering  
 Department of Applied Sciences

Academics

Undergraduate programs
MEC offers four-year long undergraduate academic degrees with a sanctioned annual intake of 540 students in the following six streams:

 Computer engineering: 180 seats
 Electronics and communication engineering: 120 seats
 Computer engineering (Business systems): 60 seats
 Electrical and electronics engineering: 60 seats
 Electronics and biomedical engineering: 60 seats
 Mechanical engineering: 60 seats.

Students who successfully complete these academic programs from the institute will receive a Bachelor of Technology (B.Tech) degree at the end.

All B.Tech courses offered by the institute are accredited by the National Board of Accreditation (NBA).

Graduate programs
The institute also offers two-year long postgraduate academic degrees with a sanctioned annual intake of 78 students in the following four specialisations: 

 VLSI design and embedded systems: 24 seats
 Digital image processing: 18 seats
 Energy management: 18 seats
 Signal processing: 18 seats

Students who successfully complete these academic programs from the institute will receive a Master of Technology (M.Tech) degree at the end.

Admission 
The admission procedure and the fee structure for the academic programmes offered by the institute are decided by APJ Abdul Kalam Technological University (KTU) and Institute of Human Resources Development (IHRD) respectively.

Admissions to the undergraduate programs are based on the ranklist prepared after the performance of applicants in the KEAM Entrance Test conducted by the Commissioner of Entrance Examinations (CEE), Kerala. 15% of total seats to the programs offered by the institute are reserved for Non-Resident Indians (NRIs). 

Admissions to postgraduate programs offered by institute are based on the ranklist of Graduate Aptitude Test in Engineering (GATE) conducted by Indian Institutes of Technologies (IITs). The vacant seats are filled based on nativity, percentage of marks obtained, and reservation criteria of the students.

Research 

MEC was the first engineering college in Kerala to be recognised by Cochin University of Science and Technology as the research centre of university in the branch of Electronics and communication engineering in the year 2010. The research areas in 2010 included Digital image processing, Signal processing, and Optical communication. 

Later, the APJ Abdul Kalam Technological University (KTU) extended the research into various specialisations including  Microwave engineering, Biomedical Signal and Image Processing, VLSI and Embedded systems, Reliability engineering, etc.

In September 2022, the APJ Abdul Kalam Technological University (KTU) decided to establish a Centre of Excellence (CoE) at MEC for advanced learning and research in the following fields of Computer engineering with industrial linkages:
 Artificial intelligence (AI)
 Machine learning (ML)
 Robotics
 Automation
The university research centre will come up at a space of around 60,000 sq.ft in the institute.

Traditions and student activities 
The foremost student body of the institute is the Senate, which consists of elected representatives from each stream. The institute has several students bodies, of both technical and non-technical nature.

Technical bodies 

These include the Innovation and Entrepreneurship Development Cell (IEDC MEC), which is a fully functioning student body registered under the Technology Business Incubator of MEC. The cell provides a platform for students to work on their ideas and take it further. IEEE student's branch, Electronics Association (Mixed Signals), the Electrical Minds Forum (EMF), the MEC Association of Computer Students (MACS), the Biomedical Association (BMA), the Model Amateur Radio Association (MARC), the FOSS MEC, the IETE Students Branch, the TEDx MEC, the Topgear MEC (mechanical association), and a robotics Club named Cyborg are some of the other student technical bodies in the institute.

There are multiple tech community and club branches in MEC which are highly active in supporting the students gain knowledge in core technical and related subjects. They include:
 Hack Club MEC: MEC branch of the international community 'Hack Club'.
 DSC MEC: MEC branch of Developer Students Club (Google).
 Tinkerhub MEC: MEC branch of Tinkerhub Kerala.

Non-technical bodies 
These include the Illuminati (quizzing fraternity), the Debate Club, the Music Club, the Bhoomitrasena (environmental club), and the National Service Scheme chapter among many others.

Excel 

Excel is the annual national techno-managerial festival conducted by MEC under the motto "Inspire, Innovate, Engineer". The event is held over a period of three days and is conducted in association with the IEEE Student Branch of the college. The festival has been held every year since its inception in 2001. It has been held as an All India Annual Technical Fest since its beginning in 2001. The 23rd edition of Excel will be held in March 2023.

Technopreneur 
It is the annual national level entrepreneurial and managerial symposium of MEC and the flagship event of IEDC MEC. The first edition of Technopreneur, Technopreneur 2006, went on to win the Best Yi-Net event at the CII National Summit in Mumbai. The 13th edition of Technopreneur will be held in March 2023. The symposium attracts over 2000 participants across the nation.

Arts and sports 
Arts and sports festivals are conducted every year by the college senate. The College Senate divides students into 4 houses, each with a captain and a co-captain. The houses compete with each other for the Arts, Sports and Overall trophies across multiple events. Houses are formed exclusively for the arts and sports competitions and are dissolved soon after. There is a College inauguration ceremony. Arts and Sports festivals are conducted annually in the even semesters. The Arts festival of the university is named Sargam which was later changed to Layatharang. Chakravyuh is the name given to the annual sports meet. MEC was the overall champion of CUSAT inter-college arts fest SARGAM-2013 consecutively for the third time.

Placements 
Despite the COVID-19 pandemic, MEC graduates of 2019-20 batch got nearly 100% placements in 2020. Almost all of the 360 students who graduated from the institute in 2020 got recruited by over 80 companies during the campus placement drive conducted by MEC. The multinational corporations who recruited graduates from the campus in 2020 include Amazon, Microsoft, LinkedIn, ServiceNow, Amadeus IT Group, Deloitte, Synopsys, FactSet, Cypress Semiconductor, Oracle Corporation, and redBus. The highest pay package was around 30 lakh per annum during the pandemic year. The median pay package was 6.6 lakh per annum for product companies and 4.5 lakh per annum for service-based companies.

Alumni
xMEC is the official alumni network of MEC.

See also 
 APJ Abdul Kalam Technological University
 All India Council for Technical Education
 Cochin University of Science and Technology
 Institute of Human Resources Development

References

External links 

 

Engineering colleges in Kochi
Institute of Human Resources Development
1989 establishments in Kerala
Educational institutions established in 1989